Álvaro Matías Moisés (born 3 June 1987) is an Argentine professional footballer who plays as a centre-back.

Career
Moisés' youth career began with Escuela Luis Valoy, before joining Rosario Central in 2001 and River Plate in 2005. His senior career started in Torneo Argentino B with Racing de Olavarría, which preceded a 2009 move to Torneo Argentino A side Santamarina. He had made twenty-seven appearances and scored one goal across those two spells. 2009 saw Moisés join Boca Unidos of Primera B Nacional. He made his professional bow on 12 September against Olimpo, while his first goal arrived in February 2011 versus Patronato. In total, he netted twice in one hundred and fifty-nine games in eight seasons with Boca Unidos.

On 12 July 2016, Moisés moved to Torneo Federal A's Mitre. His first campaign ended with promotion, having featured twenty-seven times and netted once.

Career statistics
.

References

External links

1987 births
Living people
People from Santiago del Estero
Argentine footballers
Association football defenders
Torneo Argentino B players
Torneo Argentino A players
Primera Nacional players
Torneo Federal A players
Racing de Olavarría footballers
Club y Biblioteca Ramón Santamarina footballers
Boca Unidos footballers
Club Atlético Mitre footballers
Sportspeople from Santiago del Estero Province